This is a list of routes on Sustrans's National Cycle Network within the United Kingdom.

As the cycle network has not been fully completed, some sections of routes are still under construction.

Single Digit Main National Routes

Double Digit National Routes

Three Digit Regional Routes

Zone 1
 110: (Cleethorpes – Beelsby, Lincolnshire) linking Cleethorpes to NCR 1 at Beelsby 
 122: (Sandy – Gamlingay – Cambridge)
 123: (Eaton Socon – Cambridge)
 125: Darent Valley (Dartford) – this follows the route of the long-distance path Darent Valley Path)
 136: Ingrebourne Valley Connect2 scheme
 137: Stifford Bridge and Purfleet, (following the route of the Mardyke Way (along the Mardyke (river))
 141: Keelman's Way: Wylam – NCN 14 (along south bank of River Tyne)
 151: Sleaford branch of NCN15
 155: Morpeth
 164: Pocklington - Hutton Cranswick and Kiplingcotes - Beverley. Part of the Yorkshire Wolds Cycle Route and The Way of the Roses route.
 165: Barnard Castle - Whitby. A branch of the W2W route (previously regional route 52)
 166: Kirkham Abbey- Hunmanby. Part of the Yorkshire Wolds Cycle Route.
 167: Kirkham Abbey - Huggate. Part of the Yorkshire Wolds Cycle Route.
 168: link south-east of Middlesbrough
 169: Scunthorpe Ridgeway
 172: Towpath of Royal Military Canal
 174: Isle of Sheppey – 'Sheerness Way'
 177: Maidstone – Ashford
 178: Maidstone – Tonbridge
 179: Around the Hoo Peninsula (also known as the Heron Trail)
 195: Aberdeen – Aboyne
 196: Pencaitland railway path (RR 73) east of Edinburgh

Zone 2
 207: Devon: South Brent – Dartington
 208: South London: Raynes Park – Morden
 212: (Beddington Park, Sutton – South Norwood Country Park, Croydon)
 221: Basingstoke Canal
 222: Sussex Downs Link
 223: Guildford – Chertsey
 224: Farnham – Medstead
 231: Isle of Wight
 232: (Mitcham Common, Merton – Lloyd Park, Croydon)
 235: Isle of Wight
 236: Portsmouth – Lyndhurst
 244: Two Tunnels Greenway, Bath
 246: Totton – Romsey – Andover – Stockbridge – Kintbury
 248: Honiton – Sidmouth
 250: North Dorset Trailway
 253: South Somerset Cycleway (RR41)
 254: Wiltshire Cycleway
 255: Wiltshire Cycleway links, Chippenham area
 256: Ringwood – Wimborne Minster
 264: Castle Cary – Keinton Mandeville
 267: Bridport – Maiden Newton railway path
 270: Devon Coast-to-Coast alternate braid
 272: Devon: Ivybridge – Yelverton, also Ashburton and east
 273: southern NCN3 braid near Holsworthy
 274: Devon Coast-to-Coast alternate braid (Peter Tavy to Clearbrook)
 275: North Devon coast (former RR)
 276: North Devon coast (former RR)
 277: North Devon coast (former RR)
 278: Devon Coast-to-Coast Woolacombe braid

Zone 3
 305: Bugle, Cornwall
 326: NCN3 inland braid to Truro
 327: Launceston to Tavistock
 334: south from Bristol
 338: north from Taunton
 339: Bridgwater – Langport – Ilminster
 341: Exeter – Crediton
 344: NCN3 alternate braid to Bampton

Zone 4
 403: North Wiltshire NCN4 braid
 410: Avon Cycleway (Bristol Ring)
 413: Evesham – Cheltenham NCN45 cut-off
 416: Bristol – Yate
 423: Cwmbran – Monmouth – Ross (former RR30 and Peregrine Path)
 425: Rotherhithe – Camberwell
 426: Skenfirth – Kentchurch
 436: Dulais Valley, South Wales
 437: South Wales to Glanaman
 438: South Wales to Glanaman
 439: South Wales to Glanaman
 440: Milford Haven
442: Cotswold Line Cycle Route: Worcester – Evesham – Oxford
446: Carmarthen – Llandysul
447: Cardiganshire to Newcastle Emlyn
448: Crymych – Cardigan
451: Nantwich – Crewe – Sandbach
455: Oswestry – Ellesmere – Whitchurch (former RR31)
461: Slough / Eton Dorney
465: Pontypool – Hafodyrynys (- Crumlin); (Aberbeeg -) Cwm – Beaufort
466: Valleys
467: Valleys
468: (Trethomas -) Pengam – Abertysswyg (-) Rhymney – Bute Town
469: Bargoed – (Fochriw – Rhymney)
475: Caerphilly – Senghenydd
476: Trelewis – Taff Bargoed
477: Edwardsville – Merthyr Tydfil
478: Abercynon – Llwydcoed
481: Salisbury Plain NCN45 braid
482: Chiseldon – Marlborough NCN45 braid
485: Fosse2 link to Daventry
492: Cwmbran – Brynmawr

Zone 5
523: Kenilworth – Balsall Common – Hampton-in-Arden
524: Nuneaton-Tamworth-Alrewas
525: North Warwickshire Cycleway (W) and Coventry link
526: North Warwickshire Cycleway (E)
533: Birmingham & Fazeley Canal
534: Sutton Coldfield Connect2 – Sutton Park to Castle Vale
535: Birmingham – Sutton Coldfield
536: Banbury – Towcester – Northampton – Thrapston
539: Northampton Norbital
544: Didcot – Wantage (former Regional Route 44)
547: south-east Peak District
548: Hartington – High Peak Trail
549: Etwall – Uttoxeter – Maniford Trail
550: Caldon Canal towpath
551: Newcastle-under-Lyme – Silverdale
552: Newport – Market Drayton (former RR75)
554: Lichfield – Hednesford link
555: Stoke – Kidsgrove via Trent & Mersey Canal towpath
558: South Manchester
559: Caldon Canal Leek Branch – the Roaches
561: Warrington – St Helens – Skelmerdale
562: Runcorn – Widnes – St Helens – Wigan – Southport
566: Anglesey north coast
568: Wirral – Hawarden Bridge – Chester (former Regional Route 89)
573: Congleton – Northwich (former Regional Route 73)
574: Sewell - Berkhamsted - Chesham
576: Rickmansworth – Chesham – Wendover
577: Witney – Carterton – Cricklade
585: former RR55 Redditch – Birmingham, and canal towpath to city centre

Zone 6
622: Preston Guild Wheel (circular route)
627: Sheffield – Penistone – Kirkburton
633: Worthington – Ashby – Moira
636: Harrogate – Knaresborough, also known as the Beryl Burton cycleway
645: Sherwood Forest – Southwell
646: Carlton-le-Moorland, Lincolnshire
647: Lincoln – Worksop
648: Bakewell – Sherwood Forest
656: Coxwold – Osmotherly. The High Level Option of the White Rose route.
657: Easingwold – Upsall. Thirsk area loop
658: York northern city route
665: Wetherby – Tadcaster – York
668: north Leeds
672: Derby – Ilkeston greenway
674: Bluebell Way: Thurcroft – Woodsetts, link to Doncaster and Worksop
677: north Leeds (Roundhay Park)
680: Monsall Trail
688: Winterburn – Linton-on-Ouse. Way of the Roses central section
689: Huddersfield – Meltham
696: Airedale Greenway: Leeds and Liverpool Canal towpath Keighley – Shipley
697: Linesway Greenway: Castleford – Garforth
699: Huddersfield Narrow Canal east, and east from Dewsbury

Zone 7
700: Bay Cycle Way: Glasson Dock – Walney Island
715: Barnard Castle – Bishop Auckland (Walney 2 Wear alternative)
725: Great North Cycleway: Darlington – Newcastle – Blyth
753: West Kilbride – Largs – Gourock
754: Bowling – Clydebank – Kirkintilloch – Falkirk – Linlithgow – Edinburgh (Forth and Clyde Canal & Union Canal)
756: East Kilbride – Rutherglen – Glasgow – Kelvindale (- Bishopbriggs)
764: Clackmannan – Dunfermline
765: Stirling – Bridge of Allan
766: Star of Markinch – Glenrothes – Kirkcaldy
767: Alloa – Tillicoultry – Dollar
768: Tullibody – Alva (- Tillicoultry)
775: Milnathort – Perth – Lochearnhead
776: Newburgh – Auchtermuchty – Falkland
777: Newburgh – Newport-on-Tay
780: Hebridean Way: Vatersay – Barra – Eriskay – Uist – Berneray – Lewis and Harris

Zone 8
810: Liverpool – Ainsdale (former Regional Route 81) (out-of-zone number)
811: Valleys – Porth-Pontypridd (Rhondda Fach)
818: Llangurig NCN81 high level braid
819: Rhayader-Strata Florida southern braid
820: Llanwrtyd Wells – Strata Florida/NCN81
822: Aberaeron – Lampeter
825: Radnor Ring
862: Gellings Greenway: Kirkby – Knowsley (Liverpool)
881: Valleys (Rhondda Valley / Pontypridd – Maerdy)
882: Valleys (Rhondda Valley / Treorchy)
883: Valleys (Ogmore Valley)
884: Valleys (Garw Valley)
885: Bridgend – Maesteg – Afan Forest Park
887: Port Talbot – Pontrhydyfen – Afan Forest Park

See also
The National Byway: A non-Sustrans route, South West Scotland to South West England,  in total.

References

External links
OpenStreetMap NCN routes list
Sustrans national map
Sustrans – list of National Routes

 
 
National Cycle Network routes
National Cycle Network routes